The men's sanda (as Sanshou) 65 kg at the 2006 Asian Games in Doha, Qatar was held from 11 to 14 December at the Aspire Hall 3 in Aspire Zone.

A total of fifteen competitors from fifteen countries competed in this event, limited to fighters whose body weight was less than 65 kilograms.

Zhao Guangyong from China won the gold medal after beating Nguyễn Đức Trung of Vietnam in gold medal bout 2–0 after winning both rounds in the final. The bronze medal was shared by both semifinal losers Cai Liang Chan from Macau and Maratab Ali Shah of Pakistan.

Schedule
All times are Arabia Standard Time (UTC+03:00)

Results
Legend
KO — Won by knockout

References

Results

External links
Official website

Men's sanda 65 kg